"Everything" is a song by Christian hip hop musician TobyMac. It was released as a single on July 18, 2018. The song peaked at No. 6 on the US Hot Christian Songs chart, becoming his twenty-first Top 10 single from that chart. It lasted 31 weeks on the overall chart. The song is played in a B minor key, and 112 beats per minute.

Background
"Everything" was released on July 18, 2018, as the second single from his upcoming eighth studio album. On July 25, 2018, Toby shared a video on his Twitter, explaining the meaning behind the song,"I was on my way to the studio one day to write this song, a song I had in my head but not really in my heart. So, on the drive, I said a really simple prayer. I said, 'Daddy, if You want me to write a song other than this one, will You show me something?' As I continued drivin', my eyes began to open and I could hear Him saying, 'Nah, Toby, I'm not gonna show you somethin'. I'm showing you everything.' Isaiah 43:19 says, 'I am doing a new thing in the land. It's springing forth; do you perceive it?' I walked in the studio that day with a fresh song to write. Yep, a new song in my heart. And I'm gonna fight to keep lookin' for God in everything all day."

Music video
A music video for the single "Everything" was released on August 9, 2018. The visual features Toby performing the track around parts of a street in Columbia, Tennessee. One scene with a black car parked in front of a business was filmed in front of Paper Pulleys, Inc. on the corner of Woodland St. and E. 8th St. in Columbia, Tennessee.

Charts

Weekly charts

Year-end charts

Certifications

References

2018 singles
2018 songs
Songs written by TobyMac
Songs written by David Garcia (musician)
TobyMac songs